Eugene Bernard Williams (May 18, 1918 – May 5, 1948) was an American jazz writer who, in 1939, co-founded Jazz Information, and in 1942, co-produced Bunk Johnson.

Life and education 
Williams was born in Manhattan, New York. He enrolled at Columbia College, Columbia University, in 1934 and graduated with a Bachelor of Arts in 1938.

In June 1938, as a senior at Columbia, Williams was one of two recipients to win the Philolexian Prize for excellence in prose and poetry. The Philolexian Society was, at the time, one of the three oldest literary societies in America.  Williams received the prose prize for his essay, "The Elements of Jazz".  The other recipient, Ralph Toledano, president of the Philolexian Society, won the poetry prize for his 28-line poem, "Primavera".  The judges were Jacques Barzun, instructor of history, and Howard Theodric Westbrook (1900–1944), instructor in Greek and Latin.

Columbia cohorts 
Williams' contemporaries a Columbia included:
 Ralph Gleason, in 1939 co-founded with Williams Jazz Information, and in 1967, co-founded Rolling Stone
 Walter Elliott Schaap (1917–2005) (CC class of 1937), noted pioneering jazz historian.
 Ralph de Toledano, in 1939 co-founded with Williams Jazz Information
 Barry Ulanov (CC class of 1939) was editor of Metronome Magazine from 1943 to 1955

Family and death 
He had only one sibling, a sister, Josephine Williams (1915–1983), who had been married to Joseph Akibba Turitz (1905–1956).

Williams died May 5, 1948, in Manhattan and his body was cremated May 10, 1948, at Fresh Pond Crematory and Columbarium, located in Middle Village, New York.

Selected work 
 Articles 
 "Omer Simeon" (Omer Simeon), by Herman Rosenberg & Eugene Williams, Vol. 2, No. 1, July 26, 1940, pps. 8–9
 "New Orleans Clarinets: 2 – Edmond Hall" (Edmond Hall), by Herman Rosenberg & Eugene Williams, Vol. 2, No. 2, August 9, 1940
 "A History of Jazz Information" (transcript), by Eugene Williams, Vol. 2, November 1941, pps. 93–101

 Books (contributor)
 Jazzways, George Sigmund Rosenthal (1922–1967) & Frank Zachary (né Frank Zaharija; 1914–2015) (eds.) (© 21 January 1946; Jazzways, Cincinnati) (more than 100 photos by Skippy Adelman, Bernice Abbott, and Sargent John Marsh; 1916–2003)
  New York: Greenberg (1946, 1947); 
 (Greenberg, Publisher, founded in 1924 by Jacob Walter Greenberg; 1894–1974; & David Benjamin Greenberg; 1892–1968; sold to Chilton Book Company in 1958)

 
 

 Discography (sleeve notes)
 Bunk Johnson's Jazz Band
 Recorded October 2, 1942, New Orleans
 Musicians: Bunk Johnson (trumpet); Lawrence Marrero (banjo); Chester Zardis (double bass); George Lewis (clarinet); Albert Warner (trombone); Walter Decou (né Walter Louis Decou; 1896–1966) (piano); Edgar Mosley (drums)
 Production: Welch (album cover); Eugene Williams (recording engineer & producer); Eugene Williams (sleeve notes)
 Melodisc MLP 12–112 (re-issue)
 Pressed by Orlake Records

Notes and references

Notes

References 

1918 births
1948 deaths
Jazz writers
American music journalists
Writers from New York City
Columbia College (New York) alumni